The Canton of Bellencombre is a former canton situated in the Seine-Maritime département and in the Haute-Normandie region of northern France. It was disbanded following the French canton reorganisation which came into effect in March 2015. It had a total of 7,641 inhabitants (2012).

Geography 
A farming area in the arrondissement of Dieppe, centred on the town of Bellencombre. The altitude varies from 52m (Saint-Hellier) to 213m (Pommeréval)  with an average altitude of 146m.

The canton comprised 15 communes:

Ardouval
Beaumont-le-Hareng
Bellencombre
Bosc-le-Hard
Cottévrard
Cressy
La Crique
Cropus
Les Grandes-Ventes
Grigneuseville
Mesnil-Follemprise
Pommeréval
Rosay
Saint-Hellier
Sévis

Population

See also 
 Arrondissements of the Seine-Maritime department
 Cantons of the Seine-Maritime department
 Communes of the Seine-Maritime department

References

Bellencombre
2015 disestablishments in France
States and territories disestablished in 2015